Visa requirements for Ivorian citizens are administrative entry restrictions by the authorities of other states placed on citizens of Ivory Coast. As of 2 July 2019, Ivorian citizens had visa-free or visa on arrival access to 56 countries and territories, ranking the Ivorian passport 88th in terms of travel freedom (tied with a passport from Uzbekistan) according to the Henley Passport Index.



Visa requirements map

Visa requirements

Dependent, disputed, or restricted territories
Unrecognized or partially recognized countries

Dependent and autonomous territories

See also

Visa policy of Ivory Coast
Ivorian passport

References and notes
References	
	
Notes	

Ivory Coast
Foreign relations of Ivory Coast